Dorothy Gretchen Steeves (née Biersteker; May 26, 1891 – May 9, 1978) was a Dutch-born political figure in British Columbia. She represented North Vancouver in the Legislative Assembly of British Columbia from 1934 to 1945 as a Co-operative Commonwealth Federation member.

She was born in Amsterdam and was educated there, receiving a Bachelor of Laws degree from Leiden University. During World War I, she was legal adviser to a Dutch government rationing bureau. She married Rufus Palmer Steeves, an officer in the Canadian Army, and came to Vancouver, British Columbia in January 1919. Steeves was a founding member of the CCF. She ran unsuccessfully as a CCF candidate in the provincial riding of Vancouver-Point Grey in the 1933 general election. Steeves was first elected to the provincial assembly in a 1934 by-election held following the death of Harley Christian Erskine Anderson. She was re-elected twice and then defeated when she ran for re-election in 1945. Steeves went on to serve in CCF executives at the provincial and federal levels. She ran unsuccessfully as a CCF candidate in the federal riding of Burnaby—Richmond in 1949 and as an NDP candidate in the federal riding of Vancouver Quadra in 1963. Her interests included civil liberties, international affairs, nuclear disarmament, protection of animals, women's issues and abolition of capital punishment. She died on May 9, 1978.

Steeves wrote The Compassionate Rebel : Ernest E. Winch and his times, published in 1960, and Builders and Rebels : A short History of the CCF from 1932 to 1961.

References

External links

1891 births
1978 deaths
British Columbia Co-operative Commonwealth Federation MLAs
20th-century Canadian politicians
Women MLAs in British Columbia
20th-century Canadian women politicians
Dutch emigrants to Canada